Álex Pastor Carayol (born 1 October 1999) is a Spanish footballer who plays for FC Andorra as a centre-back

Club career
Born in Barcelona, Catalonia, Pastor made his Serie C debut for Vis Pesaro on 18 September 2018 in a game against Triestina.

On 11 September 2020, he signed with Andorra.

References

External links
 

1999 births
Footballers from Barcelona
Living people
Spanish footballers
Association football defenders
Serie C players
U.C. Sampdoria players
Vis Pesaro dal 1898 players
Segunda División B players
FC Andorra players
Spanish expatriate footballers
Expatriate footballers in Andorra
Expatriate footballers in Italy
Spanish expatriate sportspeople in Italy
Spanish expatriate sportspeople in Andorra